Syria is scheduled to compete at the 2017 World Aquatics Championships in Budapest, Hungary from 14 July to 30 July.

Open water swimming

Syria has entered one open water swimmer

Swimming

Syrian swimmers have achieved qualifying standards in the following events (up to a maximum of 2 swimmers in each event at the A-standard entry time, and 1 at the B-standard):

References

Nations at the 2017 World Aquatics Championships
Syria at the World Aquatics Championships
2017 in Syrian sport